Sidi Heddi was a Moroccan marabout and founder of the Heddāwa Islamic order in the 13th century. He has been referred to as the "patron saint of kif (cannabis) smokers."

See also 
 Qutb ad-Dīn Haydar

References

Moroccan Sufi religious leaders
13th-century religious leaders
13th-century Moroccan people
Cannabis in Morocco
Cannabis and Islam